Benthophilus svetovidovi is a species of goby native to the eastern coasts of the Caspian Sea: near the capes Sagandyk, Melovyi, Peschany, Karasyngyr, off Türkmenbaşy, probably near Ogurja Ada.

References

Benthophilus
Fish of the Caspian Sea
Fish of Central Asia
Endemic fauna of the Caspian Sea
Taxa named by Vitaly Iustinovich Pinchuk
Taxa named by Dadash Bahman oglu Ragimov
Fish described in 1979